The 2015 KTM British Junior Cup was the first KTM British Junior Cup season. The KTM British Junior Cup Championship is a support category for the British Superbike Championship.

Calendar

Championship standings

Riders' Championship

References

KTM British Junior Cup
KTM British Junior Cup